

Lapavandan (also Romanized as Lapavandān; also known as  Lapvandān, and Lapandon) is a village in Ahmadsargurab Rural District, Ahmadsargurab District, Shaft County, Gilan Province, Iran. At the 2006 census, its population was 937, in 222 families.

References 

Populated places in Shaft County